The Buzava or Buzava Kalmyks are the ethnic Kalmyk people centered in the western Republic of Kalmykia, in the present day Southern Federal District of Russia.

In 1699 group of the Dörbets of Oirat, a Choros clan within the Oirat tribe, migrated from the Buddhist Kalmyk people in the Volga River area to join the Don Cossacks people. They eventually became called the Buzava Kalmyks.

They resettled with the Don Cossacks along the middle and lower Don River in Kalmykia.

Sources
 Wixman. The Peoples of the USSR. p. 34

Ethnic groups in Russia
Kalmyk people
Oirats
Kalmykia